Elhadji Tacko Sereigne Diop Fall (born 10 December 1995) is a Senegalese professional basketball player for the Xinjiang Flying Tigers of the Chinese Basketball Association (CBA).

Fall was born and raised in Dakar, Senegal. He moved to the United States at age 16 and later played college basketball for the University of Central Florida (UCF). Fall went undrafted in the 2019 NBA draft, but later signed with the Boston Celtics. During his two seasons in Boston, he became a fan favorite. He signed with the Cleveland Cavaliers as a free agent in 2021.

At , Fall was one of the tallest NBA players and is one of the tallest living humans. At the 2019 NBA Draft Combine, his measurements set all-time NBA records for tallest height in shoes, longest wingspan, and highest standing reach.

Early life
Fall was born and raised in Dakar, Senegal. In 2011, Senegalese basketball coach Ibrahima N'Diaye, the brother of former NBA player Mamadou N'Diaye, heard from a friend about an exceptionally tall teenager he had seen  playing with friends in a local street. Fall moved to the United States at age 16. He first played organized basketball in Houston, Texas, and trained with NBA Hall of Famer Hakeem Olajuwon.

Due to his height and reach, Fall was one of the most highly scouted high school basketball centers in the nation. Fall first played for Jamie's House Charter School in Houston, where his team won the state championship. Fall played with ISTI all-stars summer travel team & for Each 1 Teach 1 on the Nike Elite Youth Basketball League (EYBL) circuit where he played alongside fellow class of 2015 recruits Antonio Blakeney and Ben Simmons. He also played in several NCAA certified events, including the NBPA Top 100 Camp in Virginia. Fall then attended Liberty Christian Preparatory School in Tavares, Florida. As a senior in 2015, Fall averaged 20 points, 15 rebounds, and 5.1 blocks per game. Rated as a four-star and three-star recruit in the 2015 high school class and nearly forty different schools expressing interest in him, Fall committed to the University of Central Florida in Orlando, who officially signed him on October 28, 2014. He played with the UCF Knights under head coach Donnie Jones.

College career

Fall played college basketball at University of Central Florida for Knights as a center. Both men come from the same city, Dakar. By his sophomore year, after N'Diaye declared for the 2016 NBA draft, Fall became the tallest player in college basketball. During his sophomore season, Fall would make considerable improvements in his playing style. In 2017, Fall was named American Athletic Conference Defensive Player of the Year. 

Fall grew to be an efficient player, ranking second nationally in field goal percentage as of January 2017. On 5 April 2017, Fall declared for the 2017 NBA draft, with the possibility of returning to Central Florida still available to him before the end of the draft lottery that year. On 24 May 2017, Fall withdrew his name from consideration for the NBA draft, to return to UCF for his junior year. During his junior year, Fall injured his shoulder, causing him to only play in 16 games, totaling 351 minutes. Coming into his senior season, Fall was named to the Preseason Second Team All-AAC. During his senior season, Fall helped lead the Knights to the 2019 NCAA tournament and secured their first victory in program history with a win over Virginia Commonwealth University. In his final game, Fall recorded 15 points and six rebounds in a losing effort against Duke University 77–76.

Professional career
After the conclusion of his senior year, Fall was named one of 80 participants (40 representing the NBA draft hopefuls) for the NBA G League Elite Camp on May 12–14. By the end of the event, Fall later got transferred into the NBA Draft Combine as one of an additional 11 participants there. During the combine, he put up new records at the event, including height (which received comparisons to former NBA player Manute Bol), wingspan, and standing reach.

Boston Celtics (2019–2021)
Despite going undrafted in the 2019 NBA draft, Fall was signed to an Exhibit 10 Contract on June 21, 2019, by the Boston Celtics. Fall played for the Celtics during the 2019 NBA Summer League season, scoring six points in his first game alongside four rebounds; in his second game he tallied twelve points for his first double-digit scoring game, alongside another rebound. He had one blocked shot in each of his first two games. Fall concluded his 2019 Summer League run participating in all five games with the Celtics and averaging 7.2 points, 4.0 rebounds, 1.4 blocks, and shooting a team-high 77 percent from the field.

On July 25, 2019, the Celtics officially announced that they had signed Fall. On October 13, 2019, the Celtics officially announced that they had signed Fall to a two-way contract, splitting time between the Celtics and Maine Red Claws. Fall made his debut for the Celtics on October 26 during a game against the New York Knicks at Madison Square Garden. He played for four minutes, scoring four points and grabbing three rebounds, with his first points coming from a standing dunk. On December 20, Fall recorded a season-high five points, along with two rebounds and one block, in a 114–93 win over the Detroit Pistons. On August 13, 2020, he logged season-highs of four rebounds and two blocks in a 90–96 loss to the Washington Wizards. Fall led the Celtics in field goal percentage during the 2019–20 season.

In the G League for the Red Claws, Fall averaged a double-double of 12.9 points and 11.1 rebounds per game. He earned All-Defensive Team honors, with averages of nearly three blocks per game.

On November 23, 2020, Fall re-signed with the Boston Celtics on a two-way contract, allowing him to play for the Celtics and Maine Red Claws in the 2020–21 season. On December 30, he made his season debut for the Celtics, recording two points, one rebound and two blocks in a 126–107 win over the Memphis Grizzlies. On January 15, 2021, Fall logged a season-high six points, along with five rebounds and one block, in a 124–97 blowout win over the Orlando Magic. On May 5, he recorded a season-high four blocks in a 132–96 blowout win over the Orlando Magic. On May 16, he grabbed a season-high eight rebounds in a 92–96 loss to the New York Knicks. Despite being under a two-way contract, Fall never played in the G League during the 2020–21 season due to the Red Claws not playing due to the COVID-19 pandemic. He also led the Celtics in field goal percentage for the second season in a row.

Cleveland Cavaliers (2021–2022)
On September 27, 2021, Fall signed with the Cleveland Cavaliers. On October 16, his deal was converted to a two-way contract with the Cleveland Charge. On November 11, Fall made his debut for the Charge, logging a G League career-high 23 points along with 12 rebounds and three blocks in 29 minutes of play. On December 22, Fall made his first career NBA start in a 111–101 loss to the Boston Celtics, where he grabbed a career-high 10 rebounds and a season-high 4 points. On January 9, 2022, he was waived by the Cavaliers.

Cleveland Charge (2022)
On January 12, 2022, Fall was re-acquired by the Cleveland Charge.

Xinjiang Flying Tigers (2022–present)
On August 24, 2022, Fall signed a one-year contract to play for the Xinjiang Flying Tigers of the Chinese Basketball Association.

Player profile
Given his size, Fall plays the center position. Fall's hands measure at 10.5 inches in length and width.

Going into the 2019 NBA draft, Fall was viewed as a great shot blocker who was relatively lacking in lane agility and three-quarter-court sprinting speed.

Career statistics

NBA

Source

Regular season

|-
| style="text-align:left;"| 
| style="text-align:left;"| Boston
| 7 || 0 || 4.7 || .786 || — || .333 || 2.1 || .1 || .1 || .6 || 3.3
|-
| style="text-align:left;"| 
| style="text-align:left;"| Boston
| 19 || 0 || 7.2 || .724 || — || .333 || 2.7 || .2 || .1 || 1.1 || 2.5
|-
| style="text-align:left;"| 
| style="text-align:left;"| Cleveland
| 11 || 1 || 5.4 || .417 || — || .286 || 2.1 || .2 || .0 || .5 || 1.1
|- class="sortbottom"
| style="text-align:center;" colspan="2"| Career
| 37 || 1 || 6.2 || .673 || — || .320 || 2.4 || .2 || .1 || .8 || 2.2

Playoffs

|-
| style="text-align:left;"| 2020
| style="text-align:left;"| Boston
| 2 || 0 || 1.5 || 1.000 || — || .500 || .5 || .0 || .0 || .0 || 1.5
|-
| style="text-align:left;"| 2021
| style="text-align:left;"| Boston
| 1 || 0 || 1.0 || — || — || — || 1.0 || .0 || .0 || .0 || .0
|- class="sortbottom"
| style="text-align:center;" colspan="2"| Career
| 3 || 0 || 1.3 || 1.000 || — || .500 || .7 || .0 || .0 || .0 || 1.0

College

|-
| style="text-align:left;"| 2015–16
| style="text-align:left;"| UCF
| 30 || 26 || 17.6 || .750 || — || .558 || 5.9 || .3 || .1 || 2.3 || 7.4
|-
| style="text-align:left;"| 2016–17
| style="text-align:left;"| UCF
| 36 || 36 || 26.3 || .715 || .000 || .462 || 9.5 || .6 || .3 || 2.6 || 10.9
|-
| style="text-align:left;"| 2017–18
| style="text-align:left;"| UCF
| 16 || 15 || 21.9 || .767 || — || .460 || 7.3 || .3 || .3 || 1.9 || 11.3
|-
| style="text-align:left;"| 2018–19
| style="text-align:left;"| UCF
| 32 || 32 || 24.9 || .750 || — || .363 || 7.7 || .5 || .3 || 2.6 || 11.0
|- class="sortbottom"
| style="text-align:center;" colspan="2"| Career
| 115 || 110 || 23.0 || .740 || .000 || .432 || 7.7 || .4 || .2 || 2.4 || 10.1

Personal life
Fall is a Muslim, and selected the jersey number 99 with the Celtics as a reference to the 99 Names of Allah. He maintained a 4.0 grade point average (GPA) in high school, while taking advanced mathematics and science classes. He became fluent in English within eight months and scored in the 95th percentile on the SAT. He was a computer science major at UCF and originally had aspirations of becoming an engineer for electronic companies such as Siemens or Microsoft.

References

External links

 
 Fox Sports New Interview Tacko's first
 UCF Knights bio
 NBADraft.net profile
 DraftExpress.com profile

1995 births
Living people
Basketball players from Dakar
Boston Celtics players
Centers (basketball)
Cleveland Cavaliers players
Cleveland Charge players
Maine Red Claws players
National Basketball Association players from Senegal
Senegalese expatriate basketball people in the United States
Senegalese men's basketball players
Senegalese Muslims
UCF Knights men's basketball players
Undrafted National Basketball Association players
Senegalese expatriate basketball people in China
Xinjiang Flying Tigers players